Pilodeudorix rodgersi is a butterfly in the family Lycaenidae. It is found in Tanzania, from the north-eastern part of the country to the Uluguru and Usambara mountains.

References

Endemic fauna of Tanzania
Butterflies described in 1985
Deudorigini